Violent Moment is a 1959 British drama film directed by Sidney Hayers and starring Lyndon Brook, Jane Hylton and Jill Browne. It was made as a B film for release on the lower-half of a double bill. It was the film editor Hayers' first film as director. It also marked the debut of Moira Redmond. It was released in the United States as Rebound.

The film was released with its own credits, in the cinema. Later, it was released in the Edgar Wallace Mysteries, with that shows credits, of Wallace's statue, surrounded by whirling cigarette smoke.

The film is based on a story by Roy Vickers, from his 'Department of Dead Ends' series, originally published from 1934. These stories were ‘inverted’ mysteries: the reader knows the identity of the criminal, but the interest lies in how the detective solves the case and featured detectives dusting off cold cases. As with many of the criminals in Vickers’ stories, the protagonist Doug, is sympathetically depicted.

Premise
A deserter from the British Army kills his girlfriend during a fight. Although he becomes a successful businessman, his past eventually catches up with him.

Cast
 Lyndon Brook as Douglas Baines  
 Jane Hylton as Daisy Hacker  
 Jill Browne as Janet Greenway  
 John Paul as Sgt. Ranson  
 Rupert Davies as Bert Glennon  
 Moira Redmond as Kate Glennon 
 Bruce Seton as Inspector Davis  
 Martin Miller as Hendricks
 Gerald Naderson as Police Superintendent  
 Martin Boddey as Nightwatchman  
 John Boxer as Det. Sgt. Jarman  
 Frederick Piper as Jenkins

Critical reception
Noirish wrote, "although the cheapness of the production is very evident and the aspirations are modest, this is by no means a negligible movie."

References

Bibliography
 Michael, Robert & Cotter, Bob. The Women of Hammer Horror: A Biographical Dictionary and Filmography. McFarland, 2013. 
 Murphy, Robert. British Cinema and the Second World War. Bloomsbury Publishing, 2005.

External links

1959 films
British drama films
1959 drama films
Films directed by Sidney Hayers
1959 directorial debut films
1950s English-language films
1950s British films